Mohamed Abdulredha (born 27 September 1989) is a Bahraini handball player for Al-Najma and the Bahraini national team.

He represented Bahrain at the 2019 World Men's Handball Championship and at the delayed 2020 Summer Olympics.

References

External links
 
 

1989 births
Living people
Bahraini male handball players
Asian Games medalists in handball
Asian Games silver medalists for Bahrain
Medalists at the 2018 Asian Games
Handball players at the 2018 Asian Games
Olympic handball players of Bahrain
Handball players at the 2020 Summer Olympics